= Kasaba Natu =

Village in Maharashtra

- Village
- Interactive map of Kasaba Natu
- Country: India
- State: Maharashtra

Kasaba Natu is a small village in Ratnagiri district, Maharashtra state in Western India. The 2011 Census of India recorded a total of 595 residents in the village. Kasaba Natu's geographical area is approximately 637 hectares (1,570 acres).
